Brown Hall may refer to:

 Brown Hall (Georgia Tech), Atlanta, Georgia
 Brown's Hall-Thompson's Opera House, Pioche, Nevada, listed on the National Register of Historic Places in Nevada
 Brown Hall (Socorro, New Mexico), listed on the National Register of Historic Places in Socorro County, New Mexico
 Brown Hall (Barnard, South Dakota), listed on the National Register of Historic Places in Brown County, South Dakota

See also: 
Williamsburg Bray School in Virginia, called Brown Hall after 1920s

Architectural disambiguation pages